The Jumping-Off Place is a children's novel by Marian Hurd McNeely about homesteading in South Dakota. It is set on the Dakotan prairie in the early 1900s. The novel, illustrated by William Siegel was first published in 1929 and was a retrospective Newbery Honor recipient for 1930.

Plot
The four orphaned Linville children - Becky, Dick, Phil, and Joan - move to South Dakota in 1910 to "prove up" on a homestead claim originally filed by their uncle Jim, who raised them and who died suddenly just before the story starts. They deal with unexpected expenses, unpleasant neighbors, claim jumpers, bad weather, and other problems, but eventually triumph over them all and gain the respect and friendship of the nearby town's inhabitants. Though they had originally intended to sell or rent the claim once they owned it, they decide at the end of the book to stay in South Dakota, having come to love the prairie.

References

1929 American novels
American children's novels
Children's historical novels
Newbery Honor-winning works
Novels set in South Dakota
Novels set in the 1900s
Novels about orphans
1929 children's books